UMS Moattama (1501) also UMS Mottama is the first landing platform dock (LPD) and current flagship of the Myanmar Navy. Like other LPDs, Moattama is designed for amphibious operations, transportation of personnel as well as disaster relief and humanitarian assistance. It has a well deck and two helicopter landing spots and hangar. Moattama was based on the  design used by Dae Sun for the LPDs ordered by Indonesia and Peru. It is also expected to be able to accommodate at least two Mi-17 medium helicopters in its flight deck.

Myanmar joins other navies in the ASEAN region that operate LPD-type ships including Indonesia and the Philippines which operate ships based on the Makassar class, and Singapore and Thailand which both operate ships based on the  design.

See also
 
 
 
 
5-Series class : Fast Attack Craft

References

Ships of the Myanmar Navy
2019 ships
Ships built in South Korea
Makassar-class landing platform docks